This page provides the summaries of the AFC second round matches for 2014 FIFA World Cup qualification.

Format
In this round the eight winners from the first round joined the 22 AFC sides seeded 6–27 in the AFC World Cup rankings. The teams were drawn into 15 home-and-away ties. The draw took place on 30 March 2011 at AFC House in Kuala Lumpur, Malaysia, along with the draw for the first round.

The matches were held prior to the main draw for the 2014 FIFA World Cup, with first legs on 23 July 2011 and second legs on 28 July. The 15 winners joined the top five seeded AFC teams in the main draw for the third round of the Asian qualifiers.

Seeding
Teams were seeded into two pots – Pot 1 included teams ranked 6–20 and Pot 2 teams ranked 21–27 along with the 8 first round winners.

† First round winners whose identities were not known at the time of the draw

Results

|}

Thailand won 3–2 on aggregate and advanced to the Third round.

Lebanon won 4–2 on aggregate and advanced to the Third round.

China PR won 13–3 on aggregate and advanced to the Third round.

Indonesia won 5–4 on aggregate and advanced to the Third round.

Kuwait won 5–1 on aggregate and advanced to the Third round.

Oman won 5–0 on aggregate and advanced to the Third round.

Saudi Arabia won 8–0 on aggregate and advanced to the Third round.

Iran won 5–0 on aggregate and advanced to the Third round.

Tajikistan was awarded the tie (6–0 on aggregate) and advanced to the Third round.

Qatar won 4–2 on aggregate and advanced to the Third round.

Iraq won 2–0 on aggregate and advanced to the Third round.

Singapore won 6–4 on aggregate and advanced to the Third round.

Uzbekistan won 7–0 on aggregate and advanced to the Third round.

United Arab Emirates won 5–2 on aggregate and advanced to the Third round.

Jordan won 10–1 on aggregate and advanced to the Third round.

Goalscorers
There were 109 goals scored in 30 games, for an average of 3.63 goals per game.

4 goals

 Yang Xu
 Hassan Abdel-Fattah

3 goals

 Safee Sali
 Nasser Al-Shamrani
 Raja Rafe

2 goals

 Chen Tao
 Deng Zhuoxiang
 Hao Junmin
 Yu Hanchao
 Cristian Gonzáles
 Karim Ansarifard
 Amer Deeb
 Ahmad Hayel
 Yousef Nasser
 Visay Phaphouvanin
 Amad Al Hosni
 Murad Alyan
 Yusef Ahmed
 Aleksandar Đurić
 Shi Jiayi
 Datsakorn Thonglao
 Mohamed Al Shehhi
 Bahodir Nasimov

1 goal

 Jahid Hasan Ameli
 Mithun Chowdhury
 Qu Bo
 Jeje Lalpekhlua
 Gouramangi Singh
 Muhammad Ilham
 Mohammad Nasuha
 Muhammad Ridwan
 Saeid Daghighi
 Ali Karimi
 Mohammad Reza Khalatbari
 Alaa Abdul-Zahra
 Hawar Mulla Mohammed
 Abdallah Deeb
 Saeed Murjan
 Waleed Ali
 Fahad Al Ansari
 Musaed Neda
 Soukaphone Vongchiengkham
 Tarek Al Ali
 Ali Al Saadi
 Mahmoud El Ali
 Hassan Maatouk
 Abdul Hadi Yahya
 Bharat Khawas
 Ismail Sulaiman Al Ajmi
 Ahmed Mubarak Al Mahaijri
 Stephan Schröck
 Mohammed Kasola
 Meshal Mubarak
 Osama Al-Muwallad
 Mohammad Al-Sahlawi
 Hassan Fallatah
 Osama Hawsawi
 Mohammed Noor
 Fahrudin Mustafić
 Qiu Li
 George Mourad
 Nadim Sabagh
 Kamil Saidov
 Jakkaphan Kaewprom
 Arslanmyrat Amanow
 Gahrymanberdi Çoňkaýew
 Wýaçeslaw Krendelew
 Berdi Şamyradow
 Ismail Al Hammadi
 Hamdan Al Kamali
 Ali Al-Wehaibi
 Ulugbek Bakayev
 Marat Bikmaev
 Server Djeparov
 Alexander Geynrikh
 Victor Karpenko
 Nguyễn Quang Hải
 Nguyễn Trọng Hoàng

1 own goal
 Farrukh Choriyev (playing against Syria)

Notes

References

External links
Results and schedule (FIFA.com version)
Results and schedule (the-AFC.com version)

2014 FIFA World Cup qualification (AFC)
Qual